PNS Babur (D-182) was a  that served in the Surface Command of the Pakistan Navy from 1993 until being decommissioned in 2014.

Upon being acquired by Pakistan in 1993, she went through a modernization and refitting program by the KSEW Ltd. at the Naval Base Karachi in 1998–2002 to be classified as destroyer.

Service history

Acquisition, construction, modernization, and deployments

During her service with the Royal Navy, she suffered an incident involving a fire in an engine room caused by a fuel leak, while docking in Singapore in 1977, drawing attention to the risk of building warships with aluminium superstructure.

After successful negotiations took place between Pakistan and the United Kingdom, she was procured in 1993, and reported to its base on 8 January 1994.

She was named after Babur, the founder of the Mughal Dynasty, which ruled the Indian subcontinent for nearly three centuries.

Upon reporting, she underwent an extensive modernization and mid-life upgrade program by the KSEW Ltd. at the Naval Base Karachi in 1998–2002.

The Royal Navy refrained from transferring the Exocet and Seacat missile systems to Pakistan, instead Pakistan installed the LY-60 in place of Exocet system. Her electronic system had the Signaal DA08 air search radar replaced the Type 992 and SRBOC chaff launchers and 20 mm and 30 mm guns were fitted. Her wartime deployment included her actions in the Arabian Sea and Indian Ocean.

A video surfaced on the Internet reportedly showing Babur taking measures that brushed off against the Indian Navy frigate Godavari, causing material damage to Godavari.

It was reported by the Indian news station, NDTV, "the helicopter net of Godavari was reportedly damaged from Baburs maneuvering."

After serving with 22 years of military service, Babur was reportedly retired and decommissioned from service in December 2014.

Gallery

See also
2011 India–Pakistan border shooting
Operation Hope of Noah
List of active Pakistan Navy Ships

References

External links

Media files
 
 

1971 ships
Tariq-class destroyers
Ships built in Pakistan
Maritime incidents in 2014
Military operations of the insurgency in Khyber Pakhtunkhwa